Ri Myong-jun (hanja: 李明俊; born August 16, 1990 in Pyongyang) is a North Korean professional footballer who currently plays for Singhtarua in Thai Premier League.

Career
Ri represented his country North Korea at the 2007 FIFA U-17 World Cup in South Korea.

Ri began his career for Sobaeksu Sports Group and signed in July 2009 for FC Dinaburg. After the club's elimination from Virsliga in 2009 he became an unrestricted free agent and joined FC Daugava.

In August 2010 he left Daugava.

On 7 May 2011, he signed for FC Vestsjælland who plays in the Danish 1st Division.
In 2012, he signed for Muangthong United but was loan to Singhtarua F.C. and he was one of the main players in the team. In December 2012 he was called up for the North Korea national football team For the 2013 EAFF East Asian Cup and was the top scorer with 4 goals but did not manage to take them to the last round.

International goals

References

External links

Ri Myong-jun at DPRKFootball

1990 births
Living people
North Korean footballers
North Korean expatriate footballers
Association football forwards
Expatriate footballers in Latvia
Sportspeople from Pyongyang
Expatriate footballers in Thailand
North Korean expatriate sportspeople in Thailand
North Korea international footballers